Algolia is a proprietary search engine offering, usable through the software as a service (SaaS) model.

Company 
Algolia was founded in 2012 by Nicolas Dessaigne and Julien Lemoine, both originally from Paris, France. It was originally a company focused on offline search on mobile phones. Later it was selected to be part of Y Combinator's Winter 2014 class.

Starting with two data centres in Europe and the US, Algolia opened a third centre in Singapore in March 2014, and as of 2019, claimed to be present in over 70 data centers across 16 worldwide regions. It serves roughly 11,000+ customers, handling 60 billion user queries per month. In May 2015, Algolia received $18.3M in a series A investment from a financial group led by Accel Partners, and in 2017 a $53M series B investment, also led by Accel Partners. From June 2016 to September 2019, the usage of Algolia by small websites increased from 632 to 5,168 in the "top 1 million websites" and 197 in the "top 10k websites" evaluated by BuiltWith.

In January 2021, Algolia acquired Romanian AI and machine learning startup MorphL.

In July 2021, Algolia raised a $150 million Series D funding round and became a unicorn, with a valuation of $2.25 billion.

Products and technology 
The Algolia model provides search as a service, offering web search across a client's website using an externally hosted search engine. Although in-site search has long been available from general web search providers such as Google, this is typically done as a subset of general web searching. The search engine crawls or spiders the web at large, including the client site, and then offers search features restricted to only that target site. This is a large and complex task, available only to large organisations at the scale of Google or Microsoft.

Algolia's product only indexes their clients' sites, simplifying the search task. Data for the client site is pushed from the client to Algolia via a RESTful JSON API, then the search box is added to the client's web pages. This search model is intended to replicate the advantage of a full in-house search engine but with a simplified setup.

Products

Algolia claims a number of advantages for their approach, including speed of response from searching a single site rather than the entire web. Moreover, as Algolia's search can be tailored to the client site, its known structure and its metadata facets, the search offered can be smarter and more site-specific than a generalised web text search. This improves the relevance of search results as searching may take the semantics of site content into account. A web site selling both puppies and dog clutches could avoid the search confusions and homonymy that bedevil the simple text-based search approaches.

Algolia emphasizes their ability to provide instantaneous, multi-platform and typo-tolerant features. Algolia's software is closed source. They do however contribute to the open source community to an extent. For example Algolia DocSearch, which provides free search for open-source documentation websites, Algolia Places and Algolia GeoSearch.

API
Algolia provides their search service via various APIs. The Rest API provides basic features of search, analysis and monitoring. There are 10 supported languages and platforms for client usage. Supported languages include Python, Ruby, PHP, JavaScript, Java, Go, C#, Scala. Two mobile platforms, iOS, Android, are supported. Algolia can be also integrated with four web frameworks: Ruby on Rails, Symfony, Django and Laravel. For user interface, Algolia has a few UI libraries options to choose from.

Besides these products, Algolia also has integration with other open source and third-party software, including Drupal, WordPress and Magento.

Infrastructure
Algolia documented one attempt to remove all single points of failure in their architecture and proposed a worldwide infrastructure called Distributed Search Network to efficiently reply to a search query from any location.

The DSN feature allows to set the locations in Algolia's network where the data should be duplicated. The API and queries are routed from the end-user's browser or mobile application to the closest location in the network. That setup helped reduce processing latency for the end users, and improves availability for their searches.

See also 
 Apache Lucene
 Apache Solr
 Elasticsearch
 Coveo
 Lucidworks

References

External links 

Internet search engines
Semantic Web
Y Combinator companies
Online companies of the United States
Search engine software